The Battle of Vezekény occurred during the 17th century Ottoman Wars in Europe. It was a major Hungarian victory.

Tamás Esterházy  was killed in the battle along with his younger brother Gáspár and his cousin László.

In the library 
The Battle of Vezekény is written in Slovak fiction:

Šoltés, Tomáš : Kronika odbojov - Anarchia (historical novel, 2019), ISBN 9788057010890

References

Conflicts in 1652
Battles involving Hungary
Battles involving the Ottoman Empire
Battles of the Ottoman–Hungarian Wars
1652 in Europe
1652 in the Ottoman Empire